Myllokunmingiidae is a group of very early, jawless prehistoric fish (Agnathans) which lived during the Cambrian period.  The Myllokunmingiids are the earliest known group of craniates.  The group contains three genera, Haikouichthys, Myllokunmingia, and Zhongjianichthys. Their fossils have been found only in the Maotianshan Shales lagerstätte.

Taxonomy
 Order †Myllokunmingiida Shu, 2003
 Family †Myllokunmingiidae Shu, 2003
 Genus †Haikouichthys Luo, Hu & Shu 1999 sensu Shu et al., 2003
 Species †Haikouichthys ercaicunensis Luo, Hu & Shu 1999 sensu Shu et al., 2003
 Genus †Myllokunmingia Shu, Zhang & Han, 1999
 Species †Myllokunmingia fengjiaoa Shu, Zhang & Han, 1999
 Genus †Zhongjianichthys Shu, 2003
 Species †Zhongjianichthys rostratus Shu, 2003

See also
Other stem vertebrates or transitional between olfactores and vertebrates are:
Metaspriggina
Yunnanozoon
Palaeospondylus
Zhongxiniscus
Haikouella

References

Prehistoric jawless fish families
Cambrian chordates
Cambrian first appearances
Cambrian extinctions